Three Janus-class torpedo-boat destroyers (TBDs) served with the Royal Navy.

As was typical for torpedo craft at the time, the Admiralty left detailed design to the builders, laying down only broad requirements.

In September 1913 the Admiralty re-classed all the remaining 27-knotter destroyers, including all three Janus-class vessels, as A Class destroyers.

Bibliography

References

 
Ship classes of the Royal Navy